Aïn Fakroun  is a town and commune in Algeria. According to the 2008 census it has a population of 48,804.

Localities  of the commune 
The commune of Aïn Fakroun is composed of 28 localities:

References

Communes of Oum El Bouaghi Province